Doug McGrath (born April 13, 1935) is a Canadian actor whose most notable role was that of "Peter" in the acclaimed Canadian film Goin' Down the Road (1970) and its sequel Down the Road Again (2011). He also played in acclaimed Canadian films Wedding in White (1972), The Hard Part Begins (1973), the original Black Christmas (1974), Russian Roulette (1975) and Coming Out Alive (1980). He had a supporting role as a gym teacher in the cult comedy Porky's (1981), and also played roles in The Escape Artist (1982), Twilight Zone: The Movie (1983), the Australian comedy The Return of Captain Invincible (1983), Always (1989) and Ghosts of Mars (2001).

During McGrath's acting time in the U.S. he also appeared in several films alongside Clint Eastwood, including The Outlaw Josey Wales (1976), The Gauntlet (1977), Bronco Billy (1980) and Pale Rider (1985).

Filmography

References

External links

Down the Road Again with actor Doug McGrath

Canadian male film actors
Canadian male television actors
1935 births
Living people
Male actors from Vancouver
Best Actor Genie and Canadian Screen Award winners